The 2018 Trofeo Faip–Perrel was a professional tennis tournament played on hard courts. It was the thirteenth edition of the tournament which was part of the 2018 ATP Challenger Tour. It took place in Bergamo, Italy between 19 and 25 February 2018.

Singles main-draw entrants

Seeds

 1 Rankings were as of 12 February 2018.

Other entrants
The following players received wildcards into the singles main draw:
  Alejandro Davidovich Fokina
  Thiemo de Bakker
  Ernests Gulbis
  Gianluigi Quinzi

The following players received entry into the singles main draw as special exempts:
  Matteo Berrettini
  Constant Lestienne

The following players received entry from the qualifying draw:
  Sadio Doumbia
  Laurynas Grigelis
  Filip Horanský
  Nino Serdarušić

The following players received entry as lucky losers:
  Andrea Basso
  Luca Vanni

Champions

Singles

 Matteo Berrettini def.  Stefano Napolitano 6–2, 3–6, 6–2.

Doubles

 Scott Clayton /  Jonny O'Mara def.  Laurynas Grigelis /  Alessandro Motti 5–7, 6–3, [15–13].

References

2018 ATP Challenger Tour
2018